Wajdi Bouazzi (born 16 August 1985) is a Tunisian international footballer.

Club career
Bouazzi first began his footballing career with hometown club AS Kasserine. After spending two years with Kasserine, he made his big move to Tunis-based club Espérance in July 2006. It was here that the winger became regular for the team, helping the club to a runners-up position at the 2010 and 2012 editions of the CAF Champions League and actually winning the competition in 2011. Following this triumph, Bouazzi would also go on to feature at the 2011 FIFA Club World Cup as his team was only able to manage a sixth place finish. During his time with Espérance, in domestic play the club won four league titles and three Tunisian Cups.

In the summer of 2013 Bouazzi joined FC Lausanne-Sport, his first club abroad, and competed in the Swiss Super League after signing a two-year contract. However, his stay at the club was extremely brief as after three games into the season the player broke his contract with club and left by mutual consent.

International career
Bouazzi is a Tunisian international and has so far earned one cap for the national team. He made his debut in a 2014 FIFA World Cup qualifier against Cape Verde on 9 June 2012 with the team claiming a 2-1 away win.

Honours

Club
Espérance
 Tunisian Ligue Professionnelle 1 (4): 2008–09, 2009–10, 2010–11, 2011–12
 Tunisian Cup (3): 2007, 2008, 2011
 CAF Champions League (1): 2011

References

External links
 
 
 

1985 births
Living people
People from Kasserine Governorate
Association football midfielders
Tunisian footballers
Tunisia international footballers
Tunisian expatriate footballers
Tunisian expatriate sportspeople in Switzerland
Expatriate footballers in Switzerland
Tunisian expatriate sportspeople in Qatar
Expatriate footballers in Qatar
Espérance Sportive de Tunis players
AS Kasserine players
FC Lausanne-Sport players
Mesaimeer SC players
Swiss Super League players
Qatar Stars League players